The Nyali languages are a clade of Bantu languages coded Zone D.33 in Guthrie's classification. They are:
 Budu, Ndaka, Nyali, Vanuma, Mbo

They might belong in with the Mbole–Enya languages, but the connection could be with Lengola, which constitutes the Lebonya proposal (Nurse 2003).

The Nyali languages were treated as a dialect cluster by Guthrie. Ethnologue notes that Mbo, Ndaka, Budu, Vanuma, and Nyali are quite close. However, Beeke and Ngbee are more distant; Ethnologue suggests Beeke is closer to Bali, and leaves extinct Ngbee unclassified within Bantu.

Footnotes

References